Ronaldo Antunacci Charles Affif (December 30, 1965), known professionally as Ron Affif, is an American jazz guitarist of Lebanese and Italian origin. He is the son of boxer Charley Zivic, who was a jazz fan and encouraged his son.

Career
Born Ronaldo Antunacci Charles Affif in Pittsburgh, he is mostly self-taught. At the age of twelve, he took lessons from his uncle, guitarist Ron Anthony. In 1984, after graduating from high school, he moved to Los Angeles, where he worked with Dick Berk, Pete Christlieb, Dave Pike, and Jack Sheldon, then a couple years later moved to New York City. He led a band which included Colin Bailey, Brian O'Rourke, Andy Simpkins, and Sherman Ferguson. In the 1990s, formed a trio with Essiet Essiet and Jeff "Tain" Watts in New York City. He has worked with  Michael Carvin, David Kikoski, Ralph Lalama, and Leon Parker.

Discography

As leader
 Ron Affif (Pablo, 1993)
 Vierd Blues (Pablo, 1994)
 52nd Street (Pablo, 1996)
 Ringside (Pablo, 1997)
 Solotude (Pablo, 1999)
 Affif, Valihora, Griglak (Hevetia, 2005)

As sideman
 Joe Ascione Post Bill Bills (Arbors, 1998)
 Miri Ben-Ari,The Temple of Beautiful (Half Note, 2003)
 Alexis Cole, Zingaro (Canopy 2007)
 Allan Harris, Love Came: The Songs of Strayhorn (2001)
 Steve Hass, Traveler (2003)
 Donna Lewis, Brand New Day (Palmetto, 2015)
 John Pisano, Among Friends (Pablo, 1995)

References

External links
 Affif at Concord Music Group

1965 births
Living people
American jazz guitarists
Musicians from Pittsburgh
Pablo Records artists
Guitarists from Pennsylvania
20th-century American guitarists
Jazz musicians from Pennsylvania